Kõinastu is a 2.62 km² islet in the southern part of the Väinameri Sea, Estonia. Administratively it forms Kõinastu village which is part of Saaremaa Parish, Saare County. Kõinastu has a population of 4.

References

Estonian islands in the Baltic
Villages in Saare County